A Diplomatic Wife is a 1937 German-Polish comedy film directed by Carl Boese and Mieczysław Krawicz and starring Jadwiga Kenda, Aleksander Żabczyński and Lena Żelichowska. It is the Polish language version of Adventure in Warsaw.

Cast
Jadwiga Kenda as Jadwiga Janowska
Aleksander Żabczyński as Henryk de Fontana
Lena Żelichowska as Inez de Costello
Mieczysława Ćwiklińska as Apolonia
Tadeusz Frenkiel as Radio Reporter
Helena Grossówna as Wanda
Loda Halama as Dancer
Wanda Jarszewska as Salon Owner
Józef Kondrat as Krupka, male secretary
Jerzy Leszczyński as Ambassador
Wojciech Ruszkowski as Jan Wolski
Igo Sym as Tenor
Michał Znicz as Theater Director

References

Bibliography 
Bock, Hans-Michael & Bergfelder, Tim. The Concise Cinegraph: Encyclopaedia of German Cinema. Berghahn Books, 2009.
Kreimeier, Klaus. The Ufa Story: A History of Germany's Greatest Film Company, 1918–1945. University of California Press, 1999.
Skaff, Sheila. The Law of the Looking Glass: Cinema in Poland, 1896–1939. Ohio University Press, 2008.

External links 

1937 films
Films of Nazi Germany
German comedy films
Polish comedy films
Polish black-and-white films
1937 comedy films
1930s Polish-language films
Films directed by Carl Boese
Films directed by Mieczysław Krawicz
Films set in Warsaw
Polish multilingual films
German multilingual films
German black-and-white films
1937 multilingual films
1930s German films